Hostage justice is a Japanese-language phrase used in criticizing the Japanese judiciary. It refers to the period during which a defendant is held while denying an accusation, which is long compared with cases in which a defendant does not deny an accusation in Japanese criminal action procedure. Hostage justice is a system used by police and prosecutors to obtain confessions, regardless of  if the suspect is guilty or not guilty of a crime. Suspects can be held indefinitely under interrogation without charges. False confessions are common under these conditions, which leads to wrongful convictions for the falsely accused. Convictions can include life imprisonment and death.

Le Figaro reported that Carlos Ghosn's French lawyers described his continued Japanese detention in a complaint filed with the UNHCR as "hostage justice". CNN quoted Jeff Kingston, director of Asian studies at Temple University's Japan campus, stating "That system of hostage justice, I think, does not bear scrutiny."

See also

 Daiyō kangoku

References

Further reading

 

Japanese words and phrases